"Monsters" is a song recorded by Macedonian singer and songwriter Tamara Todevska for her upcoming third studio album. It was written by Kosta Petrov and produced by Darko Dimitrov, Lazar Cvetkovski and Robert Bilbilov. The song was released as a single through Dimitrov on 24 November 2019.

Tamara performed the song for the first time at the 21st edition of Kënga Magjike on 24 November 2019. She performed the song for the second time in the second semi-final on 5 December 2019 and finished fifth overall in the grand final on 7 December 2019. She additionally won the award for the Best Big International Artist.

See also 
 Kënga Magjike 2019

References 

2019 singles
2019 songs
Kënga Magjike songs
Song recordings produced by Darko Dimitrov